Originally named Agamemnon, this corvette was the flagship of the fleet of Laskarina Bouboulina, a key figure in the 1821 Greek War of Independence. It was built in Spetses in 1820, was armed with 18 long range cannons, and became one of the most famous ships of the War.

After Greece's independence, it was incorporated in the country's navy with the name Nisos ton Spetson.

References
 Bouboulina’s Agamemnon (in Greek)
 History-Bouboulina Museum
Laskarina Bouboulina

Corvettes of the Hellenic Navy
Ships built in Greece
Greek War of Independence naval ships of Greece